Romeo Erwan Marius Castelen (born 3 May 1983) is a Dutch former footballer who played as a right winger.

Club career

ADO Den Haag
Born in Paramaribo, Suriname, Castelen started his professional career with ADO Den Haag, playing two full seasons in the second division. He made his first-team debut at not yet 18, and contributed with nine goals in 24 games in 2002–03 as the club returned to the Eredivisie, as champions.

Castelen made his top level debut on 16 August 2003, in a 0–1 away loss against RKC Waalwijk. He only missed six matches during the campaign as The Hague side narrowly avoided relegation (15th position).

Feyenoord

Castelen moved to Feyenoord for 2004–05, making his official debut for his new team on 15 August and scoring a brace in a 6–1 home win against De Graafschap. He netted 19 goals in his first two years with the Rotterdam side combined, as it finished fourth and third respectively.

Together with Salomon Kalou and Dirk Kuyt, Castelen was part of an efficient Feyenoord attack. He only appeared in 23 contests in his second year however, due to injury.

Castelen could only amass 12 league matches in 2006–07 due to an ankle ailment, as Feyenoord finished in seventh position. On 22 April 2007 he scored his only game of the season, in a 1–1 home draw against NEC Nijmegen.

Hamburger SV
Castelen was declared fit prior to the start of the 2007–08 campaign, with his contract expiring at the end of that season. He was offered a new deal, but declined to sign it after deeming his future at the club as not very bright due to its recent results. However, when players like Giovanni van Bronckhorst, Kevin Hofland and Roy Makaay were signed, he reconsidered, but eventually agreed on terms with Hamburger SV from Germany in late July 2007, signing a four-year contract; he appeared in 79 official games for Feyenoord, scoring 21 goals.

Castelen made his Bundesliga debut on 11 August 2007, playing seven minutes in a 1–0 away win against Hannover 96. During his spell at the Volksparkstadion, however, he was plagued with constant injury problems, and he was released in June 2012 after his contract was not renewed.

Later years
After nearly one year out of football, Castelen signed with Russian Premier League team FC Volga Nizhny Novgorod on 15 February 2013. He was released at the end of the season.

On 3 July 2013, Castelen returned to his homeland and its top division, joining RKC. Roughly one year later, he signed a two-year contract with A-League club Western Sydney Wanderers FC. He participated with his new team at the 2014 FIFA Club World Cup, scoring the opener against ES Sétif in the fifth-place match, which ended in a penalty shootout loss after a 2–2 draw.

In the 2015–16 campaign, Castelen netted seven goals overall. Three of those came in the final series' semi-finals, a 5–4 extra time win over Brisbane Roar FC. However, on 5 May 2016, he was released.

On 14 July 2016, Castelen signed with K-League Classic team Suwon Samsung Bluewings. In the 2018 January transfer window, the 34-year old returned to his country and joined VVV-Venlo, making his debut against former club Den Haag. He retired from professional football later that year. Since then, he has worked as an agent, advising players such as Evert Linthorst and Simon Janssen.

International career
Castelen's solid beginnings with Feyenoord impressed newly appointed Dutch national team manager Marco van Basten, and the player made his debut with Oranje on 18 August 2004, starting in a 2–2 friendly draw in Sweden. His physical condition, however, denied him a spot in the squad for the 2006 FIFA World Cup.

Also in 2006, Castelen helped the under-21 team win the UEFA European Championship in Portugal.

Personal life
In 1989, both Castelen's mother and sister died in the Surinam Airways Flight PY764 crash in which 15 Surinamese footballers lost their lives.

Statistics

Club

International goals

International

Honours

Club
Den Haag
Eerste Divisie: 2002–03

Country
UEFA European Under-21 Championship: 2006

References

External links
 
 Beijen profile 
 
 
 
 

1983 births
Living people
Sportspeople from Paramaribo
Dutch footballers
Netherlands international footballers
Netherlands under-21 international footballers
Surinamese emigrants to the Netherlands
Association football wingers
Eredivisie players
Eerste Divisie players
ADO Den Haag players
Feyenoord players
RKC Waalwijk players
VVV-Venlo players
Bundesliga players
Hamburger SV players
Hamburger SV II players
Russian Premier League players
FC Volga Nizhny Novgorod players
A-League Men players
Western Sydney Wanderers FC players
K League 1 players
Suwon Samsung Bluewings players
China League One players
Zhejiang Yiteng F.C. players
Dutch expatriate footballers
Expatriate footballers in Germany
Expatriate footballers in Russia
Expatriate soccer players in Australia
Expatriate footballers in South Korea
Expatriate footballers in China
Dutch expatriate sportspeople in Germany
Dutch expatriate sportspeople in Russia
Dutch expatriate sportspeople in Australia
Dutch expatriate sportspeople in South Korea
Dutch expatriate sportspeople in China
AVV De Volewijckers players